The Vendome and the St. Ives are a pair of historic residential apartment houses in Worcester, Massachusetts.  The Vendome (17-19 Chandler) was built in 1898 by Judson W. Hall to a design by the noted local architectural firm of Barker & Nourse, on property where Hall previously had a house.  The five story building is primarily faced in Roman brick, with pressed metal bay windows, sandstone lintels, and decorative sandstone panels.  The St. Ives (21-23 Chandler) was built c. 1913, also for Hall.  It is stylistically similar to its neighbor, but is slightly wider, possessing two central window bays where The Vendome has one.

The buildings were listed on the National Register of Historic Places in 1990.

See also
National Register of Historic Places listings in southwestern Worcester, Massachusetts
National Register of Historic Places listings in Worcester County, Massachusetts

References

Apartment buildings on the National Register of Historic Places in Massachusetts
Neoclassical architecture in Massachusetts
Buildings and structures in Worcester, Massachusetts
National Register of Historic Places in Worcester, Massachusetts
Residential buildings completed in 1898